Francisco Jover y Casanova (1836, Muro de Alcoy - 19 February 1890, Madrid) was a Spanish painter of historical scenes and portraits.

Biography
After beginning his artistic studies in his hometown, he attended the Real Academia de Bellas Artes de San Fernando in Madrid, where he studied with Federico de Madrazo. After winning a third-class medal at the National Exhibition of Fine Arts in 1864, he received a government stipend to study in Rome at the Accademia Chigi. He also was a frequent visitor to the studios of Mariano Fortuny, who had a great influence on his style.

His painting of the Pontifical Court was awarded a gold medal. Many of the works he created there were sent home for exhibitions and received awards. His portrayal of the "Conquest of Oran" was purchased by the government and displayed in the Senate conference room.

Upon returning to Spain, he settled permanently in Madrid and became in involved in teaching, as well as painting. He also participated in a major project at the Basilica of San Francisco el Grande, together with Casto Plasencia, Salvador Martínez Cubells and Manuel Domínguez Sánchez, among others.

A monumental canvas, named "Represalias" (Retaliation), and some smaller works, remained unfinished at the time of his  death. A few were completed by Joaquín Sorolla, per his wishes.

Selected paintings

References

Further reading 
 Biography and works @ the Museo del Prado
 Biography @ the Real Academia de la Historia

External links 

1836 births
1890 deaths
19th-century Spanish painters
Spanish portrait painters
History painters
Real Academia de Bellas Artes de San Fernando alumni
People from Comtat
Spanish male painters
19th-century Spanish male artists